Frost damage may refer to:

Frost damage (construction), damage to constructions caused by the freezing of the moisture in the materials.
Frost damage (biology), which is damage to plants and fruits caused by frost.